William Jamahl Harris (born December 19, 1995) is an American football cornerback for the Detroit Lions of the National Football League (NFL). He played college football at Boston College.

Professional career

The Detroit Lions selected Harris in the third round (81st overall) in the 2019 NFL Draft. The Detroit Lions traded their third (88th overall) and their sixth round picks (204th overall) in the 2019 NFL Draft to the Minnesota Vikings in order to move up and draft Harris. Harris was the seventh safety drafted in 2019. He was reunited with Detroit Lions' defensive coordinator Paul Pasqualoni, who previously coached the defensive line at Boston College.

On June 4, 2019, the Detroit Lions signed Harris to a four-year, $3.72 million contract with a signing bonus of $952,244.

Throughout training camp, Harris competed against Tavon Wilson, Charles Washington, and Andrew Adams to be a primary backup safety. Head coach Matt Patricia named Harris the primary backup free safety, behind Tracy Walker III, to begin the regular season.

Harris was named the Lions starting free safety in 2021, recording 93 tackles, four passes defensed, and a forced fumble through 17 starts. He split his time between safety, nickel, and outside cornerback.

In 2022, Harris was named a backup cornerback behind Jeff Okudah and Amani Oruwariye. He was later named the starting nickelback.

On March 16, 2023, Harris re-signed with the Lions.

References

External links
Boston College Eagles bio

1995 births
Living people
People from Suwanee, Georgia
Sportspeople from the Atlanta metropolitan area
Players of American football from Georgia (U.S. state)
American football safeties
Boston College Eagles football players
Detroit Lions players